Jessie is a surname. Notable people with the surname include:

 DeWayne Jessie (born 1951), American actor
 Ron Jessie (1948–2006), American football player
 Tim Jessie (born 1963), American football player

See also
 Jesse (surname)